Kamandar Bafali oglu Madzhidov (born 7 May 1961, Dmanisi, Georgian SSR) is a Belarusian wrestler with Azerbaijani origin, Olympic Champion, World Champion and European Champion.

He competed for the Soviet Union at the 1988 Summer Olympics in Seoul where he won a gold medal in Greco-Roman wrestling, the featherweight class. At the 1996 Summer Olympics in Atlanta he placed fourth in the lightweight class, now competing for Belarus.

References

External links
 

1961 births
Living people
Georgian Azerbaijanis
Belarusian people of Azerbaijani descent
Belarusian male sport wrestlers
Olympic wrestlers of the Soviet Union
Olympic wrestlers of Belarus
Wrestlers at the 1988 Summer Olympics
Wrestlers at the 1996 Summer Olympics
Soviet male sport wrestlers
Olympic gold medalists for the Soviet Union
Olympic medalists in wrestling
Soviet Azerbaijani people
People from Dmanisi
World Wrestling Championships medalists
Medalists at the 1988 Summer Olympics
European Wrestling Championships medalists
Recipients of the Order of Friendship of Peoples
Honoured Masters of Sport of the USSR